James Dixon Lavino (born March 7, 1973) is an American composer and songwriter, known especially for his choral music and his music for film and television.

Life and career

Before 2002
Lavino was born in Philadelphia, Pennsylvania. He attended the Haverford School and sang in the choir of St. Peter's Episcopal Church in Society Hill.

Lavino earned a BA in English at Boston University and an MA in English at Yale University. From 1999-2001 he was an Associate Editor at The Paris Review. When he was 26 he began studying composition at The Juilliard School, where he was a student of Behzad Ranjbaran. His first work as a composer was writing songs for the Disney animated show The Book of Pooh.

2002-2010: years in England

In 2002, Lavino and his wife moved to London. During this period, he was commissioned to compose choral works for the choirs of St Paul's Cathedral and Westminster Abbey, among others. He was a member of the BBC Symphony Chorus from 2004-2010.

In 2007, Lavino's choral piece An Exhortation of St Peter was performed as part of the Tallis Festival and was broadcast on BBC Radio 3. In 2009, his choral piece They have become bright stars, a commission for the choir of St Paul's Cathedral (UK), was premiered in the presence of Charles, Prince of Wales; Camilla, Duchess of Cornwall; and Prince Andrew, Duke of York.  Lavino's piece Nativity, commissioned by Choir & Organ magazine, was featured in the 2007 Classic FM Christmas Concert, and was recorded by the choir of Westminster Abbey (James O'Donnell, cond.) for the Hyperion label. 

In 2008, Lavino composed the score for Alex Karpovsky's independent film Woodpecker. The soundtrack featured performances by Radiohead's Colin Greenwood, and members of the band Clap Your Hands Say Yeah. Greenwood also performed on Lavino's score to the film First Person Singular. That same year, Lavino scored an eight-part documentary series for BBC television, called Sissinghurst.

In 2009, Lavino composed the score for the HBO documentary film Which Way Home. The film won an Academy Award and was nominated for an Emmy Award.

Lavino became a citizen of the UK in 2010, and holds dual USA/UK citizenship.

2010-present: return to the USA, Fellwalker

In 2010, Lavino and his family returned to the USA.

Lavino has been commissioned several times to compose choral pieces to celebrate notable anniversaries, including the 50th anniversary of the founding of the Philadelphia Boys Choir & Chorale (We Live Today), the 100th anniversary of the founding of the Royal Navy FAA (They Have Become Bright Stars), the 200th anniversary of Abraham Lincoln's birth (We Meet Not in Sorrow), and the 750th anniversary of the founding of Merton College, Oxford (Beati Quorum Via).

In 2012, Lavino composed the score for Rebecca Cammisa's Oscar-nominated film God Is the Bigger Elvis. Lavino's other film-music work in recent years has included director D.A. Pennebaker's final film, Unlocking the Cage; Todd Solondz's Wiener-Dog; the Showtime series Murder in the Bayou; and the HBO series Murder on Middle Beach.

In 2014, Lavino was commissioned to compose music for the dedication ceremony of the National 9/11 Memorial & Museum in New York City.

In 2019, Lavino began collaborating with musical performance artist Cynthia Hopkins. They later formed the band Fellwalker. Their debut EP, Shelter, was released in 2020. A second EP, The Long Distance, and a full-length album, Love Is the Means, were released in 2021. They are frequent collaborators with drummers Dave King of The Bad Plus and Charlie Hall of The War on Drugs.

List of works

Film/TV scores
 2002: withdrawal
 2003: Cry Funny Happy
 2005: The Hole Story
 2007: I am an animal: the story of Ingrid Newkirk and PETA
 2008: Creative Nature
 2008: First Person Singular
 2008: Woodpecker
 2008: Last Orders
 2009: Sissinghurst
 2009: Which Way Home
 2009: Kevorkian
 2009: Trust us, this is all made up
 2010: No one dies in Lily Dale
 2010: The Road to Carnegie Hall
 2011: Tent City: USA
 2011: God Is the Bigger Elvis
 2012: Rubberneck
 2012: Well of Dreams
 2013: Almost in Love
 2013: Burning Blue
 2013: Code Black
 2014: Sex & Broadcasting
 2015: Freedom
 2015: Never Here
 2016: Unlocking the Cage
 2016: Wiener-Dog
 2017: One Last Thing
 2017: In Reality
 2017: Diana and I
 2019: Murder in the Bayou
 2019: The Weekly
 2020: On the Trail: Inside the 2020 Primaries
 2020: Murder on Middle Beach

Choral Works
 2000: I will lift up mine eyes
 2001: The Star in the East
 2002: Save Me, I God
 2003: Peaceful was the night
 2004: An Exhortation of At Peter
 2005: Turn, Beloved
 2006: The Eyes of the Lord
 2006: Do not go gentle into that good night
 2007: Holy Thursday
 2007: Their Lonely Betters
 2007: Nativity
 2008: Three Auden Settings
 2009: They have become bright stars
 2009: We meet not in sorrow
 2009: Before the paling of the stars
 2010: VISITATIONS
 2012: Beati quorum via
 2015: ‘'Tinsel 2017: Light 2018: We Live Today’'
 2021: Magnificat

Vocal/Instrumental Works
 2002: The Valley of Unrest
 2002: withdrawal
 2018: Improvisations One (an album of piano music)

Arrangements
 2015: Birds (a choral arrangement of the song by Neil Young)
 2017: This Boy (a choral arrangement of the song by The Beatles)

Fellwalker
 2020: Shelter [EP]
 2021: The Long Distance [EP]
 2021: Love Is the Means

References

External links
James Lavino website

1973 births
Living people
Alumni of the Royal Academy of Music
Juilliard School alumni
Haverford School alumni
American film score composers